The 2013 edition of Your World Awards, an annual awards show, was produced by Telemundo, broadcast live on August 15, 2013 at 8pm/7c from the American Airlines Arena in Miami, Florida. Voting for nominees started on June 26 and ended on July 24 at 12pm ET. The finalists were announced on July 31, and winners were announced on August 15, 2013.

Winners and nominees

Telenovela

Music

Variety

Other Special Awards 
 Mero Mero Award - Rafael Amaya
 Musical Power Award - Daddy Yankee
 ALMA Award of Your World - Eva Longoria
 Favorite of the Night Award - Gaby Espino

References

External links 

Telemundo original programming
Premios
Telemundo
Premios
Premios
Premios Tu Mundo
Telemundo